Adam Fousek (born 8 March 1994) is a Czech footballer who currently plays as a midfielder for FC Zbrojovka Brno.

Club career

FC Zbrojovka Brno
On 22 June 2019, he signed a three-year contract with FC Zbrojovka Brno.

References

External links
 Profile at FC Zbrojovka Brno official site
 

1994 births
Living people
Czech footballers
FK Pardubice players
FK Mladá Boleslav players
Czech First League players
Czech National Football League players
Association football midfielders
FC Zbrojovka Brno players
Sportspeople from Pardubice